The Motherland Calls is the compositional centre of the monument-ensemble "Heroes of the Battle of Stalingrad" on Mamayev Kurgan in Volgograd, Russia. The statue is designed in the Soviet style of socialist realism. It was designed by sculptor Yevgeny Vuchetich and structural engineer Nikolai Nikitin, and declared the tallest statue in the world in 1967. At , it is the tallest statue in Europe, the tallest in the eastern hemisphere outside of Asia and the tallest statue (excluding pedestals) of a woman in the world. If pedestals are included, that title belongs to the Statue of Liberty in New York.

Together with the Warrior Liberator in Treptower Park, Berlin and Rear-front Memorial in Magnitogorsk, the monument is a part of a triptych.

Construction
The work of sculptor Yevgeny Vuchetich and engineer Nikolai Nikitin is an  figure of a woman stepping forward with a raised sword. The statue is an allegorical image of the Motherland, which calls on its sons and daughters to repulse the enemy and return to the attack.

The Motherland Calls is highly complex from an engineering point of view, due to its characteristic posture with a sword raised high in the right hand and the left hand extended in a calling gesture. The sculpture is hollow. The technology behind the hollow statue is based on a combination of prestressed concrete with wire ropes, a solution which can also be found in another work of Nikitin's, the Ostankino Tower in Moscow. Inside, the entire statue consists of separate cells or chambers, like rooms in a building.

The construction of the monument was started in May 1959 and completed on 15 October 1967. It was the tallest sculpture in the world at the time of creation. Restoration work on the main monument of the monument complex was done in 1972, when the sword was replaced by another entirely consisting of stainless steel.

It is most likely that Vuchetich sculpted the figure from the discus thrower Nina Dumbadze, and the face from his wife Vera. According to various sources, Valentina Izotova or Ekaterina Grebneva posed for the sculpture. It is also believed that the statue has parallels with the figure of the "Marseillaise" on the Arc de Triomphe in Paris.

At night, the sculpture is illuminated by floodlights. In 2018, it was illuminated as part of a light show titled "The Light of the Great Victory", marking the 72nd Victory Day on 9 May in Russia.

Measurements
It lost this title to Japan's Dai Kannon of Kita no Miyako park in 1989. The figure measures , and the sword . The rigidity of the frame is supported by 99 metal cables constantly in tension.

Dedication
Two hundred steps, symbolizing the 200 days of the Battle of Stalingrad, lead from the bottom of the hill to the monument. The statue appears on both the current flag and coat of arms of Volgograd Oblast.

Marshal of the Soviet Union Vasily Chuikov is buried in the area of the monument, as is famous WWII-era Russian sniper Vasily Zaytsev, who killed 225 soldiers and officers of the German army and their allies in the battle of Stalingrad.

The monument is the central part of the triptych, consisting of the monuments Rear-front in Magnitogorsk and "Warrior-Liberator" in Berlin's Treptower Park. It is understood that the sword, forged by the side of the Urals, was later raised by the Motherland in Stalingrad and dropped after the Victory in Berlin.

There exists a replica of the monument in Manzhouli, China.

Structural problems
The sword was originally made of stainless steel, trimmed with titanium sheets. The huge mass and high windage of the sword, due to its colossal dimensions, caused a strong swinging under the influence of wind loads, which caused excessive mechanical stress in the place where the hand holding the sword was attached to the body of the sculpture. Deformations in the design of the sword also caused the movement of sheets of titanium plating, creating a pitched sound of thundering metal. Therefore, in 1972, the blade was replaced by another – entirely consisting of stainless steel – and in the upper part of the sword, holes were provided that made it possible to reduce its windage.

In 2009, reports said the statue was leaning due to changes in groundwater level causing movement of the foundations. The statue is not fixed to its foundations and is held in place only by its weight. An anonymous official claimed that it had shifted  and was not expected to move much further without collapsing. A program of monument restoration was developed in 2008–2009, and conservation and restoration work started in 2010.

In spring 2017, a comprehensive restoration program of the monument at a cost of two billion rubles ($35,000,000) began. The restoration of the statue was completed by April 2020.

Gallery

See also

 List of tallest statues
 Mother Motherland, name for any of several huge statues in various cities of the former Soviet Union
 Socialist realism
 Worker and Kolkhoz Woman in Moscow

Citations

Further reading
 Scott W. Palmer, "How Memory was Made: The Construction of the Memorial to the Heroes of the Battle of Stalingrad", The Russian Review 68:3 (July 2009), 373–407. .

External links

 Google Maps Satellite view of statue in Volgograd
 The Motherland Calls: Russia's symbol of victory (23 minute RT documentary) 
 YouTube video of Родина-мать зовёт! ("Rodina Mat' Zovyot!")
 View from the top and inside
 Russia's Motherland Statue Calls…For A Makeover Close up pictures of repairs being made in 2019.

Soviet art
Monuments and memorials built in the Soviet Union
Soviet military memorials and cemeteries
World War II memorials in Russia
Outdoor sculptures in Russia
Colossal statues in Russia
Concrete sculptures in Russia
1967 sculptures
1967 establishments in Russia
Statues in Russia
Sculptures of women in Russia
Sculptures in the Soviet Union
Monuments and memorials in Volgograd
Cultural heritage monuments of federal significance in Volgograd Oblast